Dievoort or Dietvoort is a place name and a surname. It has many related names.

Place name 
Dievoort or Dietvoort in the region of Breda in The Netherlands.

Confusion 
It should not be confused with the locality Diervoort, on the border of the municipalities of Nijmegen and Wijchen, where there is a Diervoortseweg (Diervoort Road), which is a place currently composed only of a large cheese farm, and not a "cluster of houses" anymore as during the fighting that took place there in 1944 and that no monument indicates.

Etymologies 

 1) Diet+voorde, place name of Germanic origin.

The place name Dievoort, found in the region of Breda (Dietvoort or Dievoort) is composed of the two words Diet, which means "people" (see Middle High German diet "people" proto-germanic * þeudā, where adjective deutsch / duits, equivalent to the old Irish tūath, proto-Celtic * teutā meaning also "people" or "tribe" and the word voorde which means "ford" (voorde in Dutch, like Furt in German and ford in English of protogermanic * furdu equivalent of proto-Celtic * φritu- Latinized in ritum, old welsh laughs, modern rhyd and protofrançais roy, king / ray, rai (still in place names), equivalents of Latin portus.This place name thus means the "public ford" is an important ford, managed by the tribe or the people and often defended by a fort or a castle.

Other fords are designated by their use: koevoort, dierenvoort, riddervoorde etc. intended for cows, animals or riders.

 2) Divo+ritum, place name of Celtic origin.

There are other places of this name such as that of Duivenvoorde, Dievoert, Dievoet, which would come from the Celtic Divoritum and would mean a "sacred ford", divoritum, or a ford dedicated to the god Týr (Tiwaz), (Zeus), or to a goddess (dia) waters. Thus Jort (Calvados), formerly Iort, Diort and Divort, would come from the Gaulish Divoritum.

In Celtic mythology, the ford was of great importance as a place of passage or limit, a particular goddess Ritona was dedicated to him. The Celtic custom was that duels between heroes and warriors would take place there as many stories tell. Thus we found many weapons in the old fords in Celtic countries. Moreover, many bronze objects such as axes, spear points, were thrown intact as an offering to the deities of the living waters, mainly in privileged places such as crossings.

Until ancient times the construction of bridges (briva) was unknown in Central Europe. They crossed at the rivers' fords, or, when they were too deep or too large by means of boats.

Other places with the same etymology 

 in Belgium:
Dievoet, is reported in the Nomina Geographica Neerlandica, as being a place located in Uccle (Brussels).

in Germany there are many places or cities named Ditfurt, Dietfurt etc. which have the same etymology as Dievoort:
Ditfurt, quoted in 974 in the Latinized form Deotfurdum, then Dhietvorden (1148), Ditvorde (1288), Ditforde (1458), fortified village located in the north-east of the Harz province, in the valley of the Bode.
Dietfurt an der Altmühl, city in the province of Neumarkt in the Upper Palatinate in Bavaria, where is also the Convent of Dietfurt.  Dietfurt, part of Vilsingen [de], district of Inzigkofen in the region of Sigmaringen, Baden-Württemberg. This is where the castle of Dietfurt, famous medieval ruin located in the municipality of Inzigkofen, in the province of Sigmaringen in Baden-Württemberg, Germany. It is in 1095, concerning this burg that the name Dietfurt was named for the first time in an act concerning the foundation of the abbey of Alpirsbach, when the brothers Heinrich, Eberhard and Hermann von Dietfurt were cited as witnesses. Below the Burg Dietfurt have been made the most important finds of Late Late Paleolithic and Mesolithic remains of Southern Germany.
Dietfurt in Mittelfranken former village became a district of the city of Treuchtlingen in the province of Weißenburg-Gunzenhausen, Bavaria.
Oberdietfurt (formerly Dietfurt), in Bavaria dependent on Massing.
Unterdietfurt (formerly Dietfurt), in Bavaria dependent on Massing.
Tiefurt, near Weimar.
in Austria
Dietfurt hamlet forming part of the municipality of Sankt Peter am Hart.
in Poland:
Dietfurt, was from 1939 to 1945 the name of the city of Żnin in Poland.
in Switzerland:
Dietfurt SG, a dependent village in Bütschwil (St. Gallen).
in the Grand Duchy of Luxembourg:
There was also a Diefort Molin, located near Steinsel.
in the Netherlands:
The place Duivenvoorde, Dievenvoorde or Dievoert, located in Holland, stronghold of the van Wassenaar family, has the same etymology.  The place Dievoort or Dietvoort is a place name in the region of Breda.
in the United Kingdom:
Deeford in England.

Surnames from the name Dievoort 
The names Dievoort (often written Dievoet in Southern Dutch) or Ditfurth [de] (High German) are also found in many surnames :

 de Divorde,
 von Ditfurth,
 van Dietvoort,
 de Divoort (in Dunkerque),
 de Diéfort, Diefort,
 Ditford (in England),
 van Ditford (Netherlands),
 Vandiford in the United States,
 Duuvoort, Duvordt, Duvoort, Du-voort, Duvevord, Duvevoirt, Duvenvoorde.
 van Dietvoort,
 van Dietvoirt: in Lier one Peter van Dietvoirt was cited in 1418.
 Verdievoert: In Vorst one Hendrick Verdievoert was cited in 1515.
 Dievort: in 1539 one Peter Dievort was cited in Deurne-Anvers.
 Dyvoet: name of a Dutch printer from Leiden. Published in 1659: Weyman, Daniel, Antwoorde in versoeck, vande heeren Weyman ende Copez, Leiden, Jan Dyvoet, 1659; 16cm. Jan Dyvoet, a printer in Leiden in 1659, had his address in 1659 which was "naest Academie", "next to the Academy".
 Dyvoort ou Dijvoort: Cornelis Dyvoort, printer in Gouda between 1654 and 1697, quoted from 1662 to 1697 as "stadsdrukker", "printer of the city". Its address was, from 1655 to 1662, "from Korte-Groenendal, then, from 1665 to 1697," from Markt, by't Stadthuis "," the Market, near the Hotel de Ville ". From 1654 to 1697 his sign was "In't Vergulde ABC" or "ABC" '"to the Golden Alphabet".
 Dyvoet is also mentioned in 1780 in the archives of the Plotho Fund, Rijksarchief, Kortrijk: n ° 4243, year 1780, Sint-Eloois-Vijve, "Proces voor de Wet van Sint-Eloois-Vijve" between A. Cottens and A. Dyvoet
 Deeford, exists in England as place and as a surname not to be confused with the village of Desford in Leicestershire.
 van Dievoort, (especially in Belgium in the province of Antwerp). In the novel "Silver and Nobility" of the Flemish writer Henri Conscience, one of the imaginary characters is a certain knight Van Dievoort.
 van Dietfoert : In Bergen-op-Zoon an Elisabeth Ren was mentioned on March 20, 1663 as the widow of Jan van Dietfoert.
 van Divoert, (On June 10, 1605, a Fransen van Divoert is quoted in Mechelen, as having taken an oath to the guild of the brewers.
 van Dievoedt, this spelling can be found in the novel by the Dutch novelist Julie van Mechelen entitled Het geheim van de tweeling, edition "Een Favoriet Roman", Nr. 18, Studio 4, where one of the characters is Julius van Dievoedt.
 Vandievoet, or Van Dievoet:
Vandievoet family, Brabant family from the villages of Haren, Diegem, Evere, Schaerbeek, Meise, in Flemish Brabant.
van Dievoet family, family of Belgian politician Emile van Dievoet.
Van Dievoet family, bourgeois family from Brussels. Called Vandive in Paris.

Personalities with this name and its variants 

Famous people with the name Dietfurt or Dievoort or Dievoet etc. include:

In the Antiquity

 Divitiacus a druid, friend of Cicero. 

 Divitiacus, king of the Belgic nation of the Suessiones in the early 1st century BC.

The German noble family von Ditfurth (in the Harz) 

Anton von Ditfurth (1588–1650), German writer and academician.

 Franz Dietrich von Ditfurth (1738–1813), German theoretician of Freemasonry.

 Wilhelm von Ditfurth, (1780–1855), general in the service of Prussia.

 Franz Wilhelm von Ditfurth (1801–1880), scholar and musicologist.

 Hoimar von Ditfurth (1921–1989), German doctor and journalist.

 Jutta Ditfurth (* 1951), German sociologist, writer and politician, daughter of Hoimar von Ditfurth

 Christian von Ditfurth (* 1953), German historian and independent author, son of Hoimar von Ditfurth

The noble German family von Dietfurt (Dietfurt Castle, Inzighofen) 

 in 1095, the Heinrich brothers, Eberhard and Hermann von Dietfurt, were named as witnesses to the founding of the Alpirsbach Abbey.

Dittforth family, Germany 

 Julius Dittforth, German politician.

Divoort family 

 Joseph Divoort, Mayor of Uccle (Belgium).

Van Dievoort family 

 Louis Van Dievoort, Antwerp painter.

Van Dievort family 

Charles Van Dievort, editor-in-chief of BFM, Belgian radio with economic orientation, journalist at La Libre Belgique

The Deeford family in England 

Charles, Viscount Deeford.

Van Dievoet or Vandievoet families

Heraldry

See also 

 Dievoet

Bibliographie 
 Chr Buiks, Laatmiddeleeuws Landschap en Veldnamen in de Baronie van Breda, p. 46
 Albert Joseph Carnoy, Origines des noms des communes de Belgique, y compris les noms des rivières et principaux hameaux, 1948.
 Frans Debrabandere et Peter De Baets, Woordenboek van de familienamen in België en Noord-Frankrijk = Dictionnaire des noms de famille de Belgique et du Nord de la France = Wörterbuch der Familiennamen in Belgien und Nordfrankreich = Dictionary of the surnames in Belgium and North France, Amsterdam et Anvers : Éditions L.J. Veen, 2003
 Nomina geographica Neerlandica, par la Koninklijk Nederlands Aardrijkskundig Genootschap.

Notes and references 

Surnames of Belgian origin
Surnames of Dutch origin
Place names